is a city located in Tokyo Metropolis, Japan. , the city had an estimated population of 74,972 in 36,376 households, and a population density of 7300 persons per km2.

Geography
Kiyose City is roughly in the shape of a wedge, bordered by Saitama Prefecture to the north, east and south and separated from the city of Tokorozawa by the Yanase River.  The city has considerable green space, with around 46% of its area remaining rural.

Kiyose is located on a flat tableland about 15 km from the northeastern edge of Musashino Plateau. The city measures approximately 6.5 km northeast to southwest and 2 km northwest to southeast, with the west side slightly higher than the east. Average altitude above sea level ranges from 65 meters at Takeoka in the west to 20 meters at Shitajuku in the northeastern side. The city area is mostly diluvial soil except for a small area of alluvial soil by Yanase River, which runs on the edge of the region.

Surrounding municipalities
Saitama Prefecture
 Niiza
 Tokorozawa
Tokyo Metropolis
 Higashikurume
Higashimurayama

Climate
Kiyose has a Humid subtropical climate (Köppen Cfa) characterized by warm summers and cool winters with light to no snowfall.  The average annual temperature in Kiyose is 14.0 °C. The average annual rainfall is 1647 mm with September as the wettest month. The temperatures are highest on average in August, at around 25.7 °C, and lowest in January, at around 2.3 °C.

Demographics
Per Japanese census data, the population of Kiyose increased rapidly in the 1950s and 1960s with the development of many large-scale public housing projects.

History
Archaeologists have found evidence of human settlement in the Kiyose area dating from over 20 thousand years ago, during the last glacial maximum. The Oishi clan constructed Taki-no-Jo Castle, but it was lost during battles with Toyotomi Hideyoshi.
     
In 1893, Kitatama was transferred from Kanagawa Prefecture to Tokyo. In 1954, Kiyose was elevated to town statu and to city status on October 1, 1970.

Kiyose was noted for many sanatoria for tuberculosis patients. Whilst the incidence of the disease has greatly decreased, the city still has the second-most hospital beds after Chiyoda Ward.

Government
Kiyose has a mayor-council form of government with a directly elected mayor and a unicameral city council of 20 members. Kiyose, together with Higashikurume, contributes two members to the Tokyo Metropolitan Assembly. In terms of national politics, the city is part of Tokyo 20th district of the lower house of the Diet of Japan.

Economy
Kiyose is largely a bedroom community, with over a third of its workforce commuting to central Tokyo every day. However, approximately 40% of the city's land area remains classified as agricultural, with spinach and carrots as the main crops.

Education
Tertiary:
Meiji Pharmaceutical University
Japan College of Social Work

Tokyo Metropolitan Board of Education operates .

Kiyose has nine public elementary schools and five public junior high schools operated by the municipality.

Public junior high schools:
 Kiyose (清瀬中学校)
 Kiyose No. 2 (清瀬第二中学校)
 Kiyose No. 3 (清瀬第三中学校)
 Kiyose No. 4 (清瀬第四中学校)
 Kiyose No. 5 (清瀬第五中学校)

Public elementary schools:
 Kiyose (清瀬小学校)
 Kiyose No. 3 (清瀬第三小学校)
 Kiyose No. 4 (清瀬第四小学校)
 Kiyose No. 6 (清瀬第六小学校)
 Kiyose No. 7 (清瀬第七小学校)
 Kiyose No. 8 (清瀬第八小学校)
 Kiyose No. 10 (清瀬第十小学校)
 Seimei (清明小学校)
 Shibayama (芝山小学校)

Kiyose has one private elementary school, one private junior high school, and one private high school.

Transportation

Railway
  Seibu Railway - Ikebukuro Line

Highway
Kiyose is not served by any national highways.

Local attractions
Kiyose Suitengū Shrine

Notable people from Kiyose
Akina Nakamori, actress, singer
Yumiko Shaku, actress, model
Maki Horikita, actress
Akane Yamao, rhythmic gymnast
Yukari Kawamoto, former rhythmic gymnast
Ai Ogura, motorcycle racer

References

External links

Kiyose City Official Website 

 
Cities in Tokyo
Western Tokyo